The 2009 Men's under-19 World Floorball Championships were the fifth world championships in men's under-19 floorball. The tournament took place over May 6–10, 2009 in Turku, Finland.

Sweden defeated Finland 8–3 in the final match to win the men's under-19 world floorball championship for the 3rd consecutive year.

All matches took place at the Turkuhalli in Turku, Finland.

Tournament information

Facts and history
The 2009 Men's under-19 World Floorball Championships were the first men's over-19 floorball championships that were held in the month of May, after the International Floorball Federation (IFF) changed their international tournament calendar format in 2008. Previously, the tournament was hosted in the months of either October or November.

Sweden came into the tournament as two-time defending champions, after having won the world championship in both 2005 and 2007. The Swedish team had also previously won a championship in 2001, but did not defend their title in 2003, as they would lose in the final to rivals, Finland. The Czech Republic, Finland, Sweden, and Switzerland remain the only teams to have captured a women's under-19 world floorball championship medal.

Championship results

Preliminary round

Group A

May 6, 2009

May 7, 2009

May 8, 2009

Group B

May 6, 2009

May 7, 2009

May 8, 2009

Playoffs

Semi-finals

Bronze medal match

World championship match

Placement round

7th place match

5th place match

Leading scorers

Media All-Star Team

Ranking and statistics

Official 2009 A-Division Rankings according to the International Floorball Federation

Denmark is relegated to the B-Division at the 2011 Men's under-19 World Floorball Championships

See also
2009 Men's under-19 World Floorball Championships B-Division
2009 Men's under-19 World Floorball Championships Qualifying

External links
Official Website
Standings & Statistics
Standings & Statistics – Qualifying

|-style="text-align:center; background: #ffa07a;"
|align="center" colspan="3"|Men's under-19 World Floorball Championships

under-19
Mens Under-19 World Floorball Championships, 2009
Floorball
2009 in Finnish sport
International sports competitions in Turku
May 2009 sports events in Europe
2000s in Turku